Chhilka Roti is a traditional bread of Jharkhand, India. It is prepared using rice flour and chana dal. It is served with 
chutney, vegetables and meat. It is also known as Chilka Roti.

Preparation
The rice and chana dal soaked in water for a night. It is grinded in morning after filtering the water to make batter and salt added for taste. Then a little oil is greased in the heated tawa and half bowl of batter is dispersed in it. After the mixture turn light brown, it turned and other side roasted. If bother side turned light brown with proper roasting, the bread is ready. It is generally served with chutney, vegetables and meat.

See also
Indian bread
Jharkhandi cuisine

References

Indian snack foods
Culture of Jharkhand
Nagpuri culture